Hackettstown Airport  is a public-use airport located in the Beattystown area of Mansfield Township, Warren County, New Jersey, United States, three nautical miles (5.56 km) southwest of the central business district of Hackettstown. The airport is privately owned. Although most U.S. airports use the same three-letter location identifier for the FAA and IATA, this airport is assigned N05 by the FAA but has no designation from the IATA.

Facilities and aircraft 
It has one runway designated 05/23 with an asphalt surface measuring 2,200 by 50 feet (671 x 15 m).

For the 12-month period ending January 1, 2006, the airport had 19,000 aircraft operations, an average of 52 per day: 100% general aviation. At that time there were 36 aircraft based at this airport: 100% single-engine.

References

External links
 
 Aerial photo as of 13 April 1992 from USGS The National Map

Airports in New Jersey
Hackettstown, New Jersey
Transportation buildings and structures in Warren County, New Jersey